The 1981 Bandy World Championship was the 12th Bandy World Championship and was contested between four men's bandy playing nations. The championship was played in Khabarovsk in the Soviet Union from 7 February-15 February 1981. Sweden became champions for the first time. The Soviet Union had won all previous championships.

Participants

Premier tour

 7 February
 Norway – Finland 1–6
 Soviet Union – Sweden 1–6
 8 February
 Finland – Sweden 0–3
 Soviet Union – Norway 14–0
 10 February
 Norway – Sweden 0–8
 Soviet Union – Finland 8–0
 12 February
 Norway – Finland 1–5
 Soviet Union – Sweden 3–1
 14 February
 Finland – Sweden 2–5
 Soviet Union – Norway 7–0
 15 February
 Norway – Sweden 1–12
 Soviet Union – Finland 5–1

Sweden champions due to better head-to-head record.

Sweden's championship squad

 Ångström
 Arvidsson
 Björk
 Boström
 Callberg
 B. Carlsson
 M. Carlsson
 GK Fransson
 GK J. Johansson
 O. Johansson
 S. Karlsson
 H. Karlsson
 Kjellqvist
 Ramström
 Sjödin
 Söderholm
 Togner
 Coach: Sundin

References

International bandy competitions hosted by the Soviet Union
1981
World Championship
Bandy World Championship
Sport in Khabarovsk
Bandy World Championship